The Minister of State for Relations with the Parliament is a ministerial post of the Albanian Government responsible for handling communications with the Parliament. The current minister is Elisa Spiropali.

Officeholders (2013–present)

See also
 Parliament of Albania

References

Parliament
Ministries established in 2013